Lars Stefan Sundelin (8 February 1936 – 18 January 2003) was a Swedish sailor. He was a cousin of the brothers Jörgen, Peter and Ulf Sundelin who competed as a team at the 1968 and 1972 Olympics and at the world championships in between. At the 1976 Summer Olympics Ulf was replaced by Stefan, and the Sundelin team finished ninth in the three-person keelboat event.

References 

1936 births
2003 deaths
Sailors at the 1976 Summer Olympics – Soling
Olympic sailors of Sweden
Swedish male sailors (sport)
Sportspeople from Stockholm